Cyril Émile Tchana (born June 25, 1983) is a Cameroonian footballer that currently plays for Persikabo Bogor in the Liga Indonesia Premier Division (LPIS). He previously played for PSPS Pekanbaru at the Indonesia Super League.

References

1983 births
Association football forwards
Cameroonian expatriate footballers
Cameroonian expatriate sportspeople in Indonesia
Cameroonian footballers
Expatriate footballers in Indonesia
Liga 1 (Indonesia) players
Living people
PSPS Pekanbaru players
Persikabo Bogor players
Indonesian Premier Division players